Maigret is a 1988 television film starring Richard Harris as Georges Simenon's detective, Jules Maigret. The film was intended as a pilot for a potential television series.

Production
While unhappily working on Archer, a television series adaptation of Ross Macdonald's Lew Archer stories, writer Arthur Weingarten began thinking about doing a mystery series with a different concept.

The studio was uninterested but Weingarten decided to pursue the rights to the character himself. Friendship with Graham Greene got Weingarten an introduction to Georges Simenon. Weingarten locked down American rights but spent five years gathering rights in other countries to attain worldwide rights to the character. He then approached every American network about creating a Maigret series with no success until CBS agreed with the stipulation that he cast an international star. Richard Burton was the first approached and he was keen but two weeks before filming was to commence he dropped out to do Private Lives on Broadway. Sir Alec Guinness was next approached but he declined. Weingarten spent a year negotiating with George C. Scott, but Scott eventually pulled out and with him went CBS.

At this stage, Columbia Pictures Television agreed but Weingarten still needed a Maigret. After viewing A Man Called Horse one evening, he decided to approach Richard Harris. Although Harris didn't physically fit the role, he was up for the challenge as a fan of the character.

The project got additional funding from HTV and Coca-Cola which brought the budget up to $3 million (US). Filming was shot on location in Paris and West Country. The script was drawn from a number of Simenon's original novels and the setting was moved up to the then-modern 1980s.

Cast
Richard Harris - Jules Maigret
Patrick O'Neal - Kevin Portman
Victoria Tennant - Victoria Portman
Ian Ogilvy - Daniel Portman
Barbara Shelley - Louise Maigret
Andrew McCulloch - Sgt. Lucas
Caroline Munro - Carolyn Page

Release
The film was unsuccessful critically which ended any possibility of it spawning a television series. Three years later, fellow Irishman Michael Gambon stepped into the role for another ITV production entitled Maigret which ran for twelve episodes.

References

External links 
 

1988 television films
1988 films
British television films
ITV television dramas
ITV mystery shows
Television series by ITV Studios
Television shows produced by Harlech Television (HTV)
Television series by Sony Pictures Television
Maigret films
Television shows based on works by Georges Simenon
1980s English-language films